Alpha Lyncis (α Lyn, α Lyncis) is the brightest star in the northern constellation of Lynx with an apparent magnitude of +3.13. Unusually, it is the only star in the constellation that has a Bayer designation.

This is a giant star that has exhausted the hydrogen at its core and has evolved away from the main sequence. It has expanded to about 55 times the Sun's radius and it is emitting roughly 673 times the luminosity of the Sun. The estimated effective temperature of the star's outer envelope is 3,882 K, which is lower than the Sun's effective temperature of 5,778 K, and is giving Alpha Lyncis an orange hue that is characteristic of K-type stars.

Alpha Lyncis is a suspected small-amplitude red variable star that changes apparent magnitude from +3.17 up to +3.12. This variability pattern typically occurs in stars that have developed an inert carbon core surrounded by a helium-fusing shell, and suggests that Alpha Lyncis is starting to evolve into a Mira-type variable.

References 

Lyncis, Alpha
Lynx (constellation)
K-type giants
Lyncis, 40
045860
080493
Durchmusterung objects
3705
Suspected variables